Ukrayina Moloda (Young Ukraine) is a daily Ukrainian-language newspaper based in Kyiv with a circulation of 99,000. It is published by State Company "Presa Ukrayiny". In the beginning of 2018 the editorial staff of the newspaper was asked to vacate its leased office at "Presa Ukrayiny".

Overview
Created in 1991 initially it was created as a newspaper of the Central Committee of the Communist Party of Ukraine steered towards younger generation, but already in August of the same year it became independent [from the party].

Ukrayina Moloda supports pro-Western policies. It also supported former president Viktor Yushchenko, and was highly critical of Yushchenko's predecessor, Leonid Kuchma. It offers both domestic and international news reporting, analysis, and interviews. 

Ukrayina Moloda is a member of the Ukrainian Association of Press Publishers (UAPP).

In 2006, chairman of the Verkhovna Rada Oleksandr Moroz won a court case against "Ukrayina Moloda".

Articles
 "Ukrayina Moloda": "Bihus-gate" is the FSB special operation or the Kolomoisky diversion («Україна молода»: «Бігус-гейт» - спецоперація ФСБ або диверсія Коломойського). Glavcom. 16 March 2019
 Start to say "No" (Почніть говорити «НІ»). Ludmila Kalabukha website.

References

External links
 Ukrayina Moloda online
 Video channel of Ukrayina Moloda at YouTube
 Information about newspaper at Verkhovna Rada

Daily newspapers published in Ukraine
Publications established in 1991
Ukrainian-language newspapers
Mass media in Kyiv
1991 establishments in Ukraine